Florian Munteanu (born 13 October 1990), also known by his ring name Big Nasty, is a German-born Romanian actor and boxer. He is known for his role of the boxer Viktor Drago in Creed II (2018) and Creed III (2023), and Razor Fist in the superhero film Shang-Chi and the Legend of the Ten Rings (2021).

Early life
Munteanu was born in Germany to Romanian parents, who fled the Socialist Republic of Romania in 1985. His mother is a lawyer, while his father is a dermatologist and a former boxer. Munteanu grew up in Bogen, and later moved to Munich to study at the university of applied science Hochschule Mittweida. In 2014 he defended his Bachelor of Arts thesis on the "Structure and organization of the sport of boxing in Germany: associations, boxing promotion companies, federations, management and marketing in general, with a comparison to the structures implemented in the USA". He has competed in boxing in Germany under the ring name "Big Nasty".

Acting career
Munteanu had his first film role in Bogat, a 2016 German-Romanian film shot in Munich. His breakthrough in acting came in 2018, when Sylvester Stallone was looking for a European heavyweight boxer to play Viktor Drago, the son of Ivan Drago, in the sports drama sequel Creed II. Stallone found Munteanu through training videos on the Internet and personally promoted him for the role.

Munteanu has joined the Season 3 line-up for Netflix's historical drama series Vikings: Valhalla. He has been cast as General George Maniakes.

Munteanu lives in Munich and Los Angeles, California. He was featured on the covers of Muscle & Fitness (October 2018) and Men's Health (December 2018).

Personal life
Munteanu is fluent in Romanian.

Filmography

Film

References

External links

 Official Instagram

German male film actors
Living people
1990 births
21st-century German male actors
German people of Romanian descent
Romanian male film actors
Members of the Romanian Orthodox Church